Valeri Frolov may refer to:

 Valeriy Frolov (general), Ukrainian general, commander of Ground Forces
 Valeri Frolov (footballer, born 1949), Russian football player and coach
 Valeri Frolov (footballer, born 1970), Russian football player